Yegorlykskaya is a rural locality (a stanitsa) and the administrative center of Yegorlyksky District in Rostov Oblast, Russia. Population:

References

Rural localities in Rostov Oblast
Don Host Oblast